William Moffat may refer to:

 William Moffat (MP) (1737–1822), English banker, merchant and politician
 William Moffat (Alberta politician) (1847–1926), Canadian politician
 William Moffat (cricketer) (1858–1932), Australian cricketer
 Graham Moffat (William Graham Moffat, 1866–1951), Scottish suffragist and playwright
 Willie Moffat (1900–1974), Scottish footballer with Hamilton, Motherwell, Hibernian

See also 
 William Bonython Moffatt (1812–1887), English architect
 Moffat (surname)